Edward Primrose is an Australian composer, writer, and musical dramaturge. He has conducted opera (Il Trovatore, The Magic Flute, La Belle Héléne) and orchestral recordings (Sydney & Melbourne Symphony Orchestras).

Early life 
Primrose trained as a composer (Canberra School of Music, ANU).

He has written symphonies, electro-acoustic music, musical theatre pieces, scripts, plays, and an opera.

He has married Dr Jo Taylor in 2021

Career 
While resident in Paris in the 1980s, he was commissioned by the Pompidou Centre to compose the music to Tony Oursler's video installation Spheres of Influence (1985). He founded the Paris Performing Group (1986), directed The Woman from American Express (Paris, 1986) for theater, wrote and directed the play Otto (Paris, 1987) and composed for TVCs and documentaries.

With the Australian Guild of Screen Composers (AGSC), he helped initiate music as a subject within the Australian Film TV & Radio School, becoming a Composer in Residence in 1995. He was then appointed as the school's first lecturer in music for film (AFTRS (1999-2000). He returned as lecturer (2006-2013).

He was the founding Artistic Director of Camera Camerata (Sydney, 1998) with the Australian Youth Orchestra - a project that brought together composers, filmmakers, orchestral players and technicians to record the music for films as well presenting them as a live concert.

He lectured on music and sound at Queensland Conservatorium, Griffith  Film School, plus universities in Sydney, Newcastle and Melbourne.

He acted in short films and TVCs. Edward wrote, directed, edited and composed the film Kill Only This One (2006). He wrote, directed and composed Ray and Ponce for radio, (Soundproof, ABC Radio National, 2014). His original music for theatre and film includes Medea (1994); Mysteriyaki (2000); Aria de mezzo carattere (2000); and for radio, Brother Boy (ABC Radio Drama, 2005); and Ghost Words (ABC Radio Drama, 2006); He composed music for the films Reverence (2000); Humanimation (2001) and The Dancer from the Dance (2013) that were nominated for best documentary (AGSC/Australasian Performing Right Association (APRA)), and A Contramano (2016).

He was awarded a PhD in 2014 from the University of Newcastle, with a thesis concerning musical dramaturgy.

References

Australian composers
Living people
Year of birth missing (living people)